Mascoll is a surname. Notable people with the surname include:

Beverly Mascoll, Canadian businesswoman
Clyde Mascoll, Barbadian politician
Jamie Mascoll (born 1997), English footballer
Joel Mascoll (born 1974), Saint Vincent and the Grenadines sprinter

See also
Noah Mascoll-Gomes (born 1999), Antigua and Barbuda swimmer